Begonia carolineifolia, the palm leaf begonia, palmate begonia or hand begonia, is a species of flowering plant in the genus Begonia native to central and southern Mexico and northern Central America. It has gained the Royal Horticultural Society's Award of Garden Merit.

References

carolineifolia
Plants described in 1852